The Philippine Senate Committee on Ways and Means is a standing committee of the Senate of the Philippines.

Jurisdiction 
According to the Rules of the Senate, the committee handles all matters relating to:

 Revenue, generally
 Taxes and fees
 Tariffs
 Loans and other sources and forms of revenue

Members, 18th Congress 
Based on the Rules of the Senate, the Senate Committee on Ways and Means has 15 members.

The President Pro Tempore, the Majority Floor Leader, and the Minority Floor Leader are ex officio members.

Here are the members of the committee in the 18th Congress as of September 24, 2020:

Committee secretary: Senate Tax Study and Research Office

See also 

 List of Philippine Senate committees

References 

Ways